Sacred Heart Catholic Church is a historic church at 727 4th Street in Alamosa, Colorado.  It was built in 1922 in a Mission Revival/Spanish Revival style and was added to the National Register in 1998.

Its construction began in 1922.

It was planned for its two towers to rise to four-stories tall, but these were never finished.

The listing included two contributing buildings and a contributing structure:  besides the church, an arcade and a rectory were built.

References

Churches in the Roman Catholic Diocese of Pueblo
Churches on the National Register of Historic Places in Colorado
Mission Revival architecture in Colorado
Roman Catholic churches completed in 1922
Buildings and structures in Alamosa, Colorado
National Register of Historic Places in Alamosa County, Colorado
Churches in Colorado
Clergy houses
20th-century Roman Catholic church buildings in the United States